The Hooters are an American rock band from Philadelphia, Pennsylvania. The band combines elements of rock, reggae, ska, and folk music to create its sound. 

The Hooters first gained major commercial success in the United States in the mid-1980s due to heavy radio airplay and MTV rotation of several songs, including "All You Zombies", "Day by Day", "And We Danced" and "Where Do the Children Go". The band played at the Live Aid benefit concert in Philadelphia in 1985. In Europe, the Hooters had success with the singles "All You Zombies" and "Johnny B", but the band's breakthrough across Europe came with the single "Satellite". The band played at The Wall Concert in Berlin in 1990.

The Hooters have staged successful tours in Europe. In 2007, the band released its first album of new material since 1993, Time Stand Still. The band's most recent release was Give the Music Back: Live Double Album, released in 2017.

Career

Early years (1980–1984)
The Hooters were formed by Rob Hyman and Eric Bazilian in 1980 and played their first show on July 4 of that year. They took their name from a nickname for the melodica, a type of keyboard harmonica. Hyman and Bazilian met in 1971 at the University of Pennsylvania. In the late 1970s, they played in a Philadelphia-based band called Baby Grand, which featured local singer David Kagan.  Baby Grand released two albums on Arista Records.

During the early 1980s, The Hooters played on the Philadelphia club scene, boosted by airplay on WMMR, the major rock radio station in Philadelphia. Their music was also played frequently on WRDV-FM in Bucks County, Pennsylvania. They soon became a huge success along their native East Coast, playing everything from clubs to high schools, while appearing on local television shows.  The original versions of "Man in the Street," "Fightin' on the Same Side," "Rescue Me," and "All You Zombies" were released as singles in this time period.

On September 25, 1982, The Hooters opened for one of The Who's farewell tour concert shows at JFK Stadium in Philadelphia on a bill that also included The Clash and Santana.

In 1983, John Kuzma (guitar) and Bobby Woods (bass) left the band. They were replaced by John Lilley (guitar, backing vocals) and Rob Miller (bass, backing vocals), two former members of another popular local group, Robert Hazard and the Heroes.

Later on in 1983, The Hooters began working at last on their first album. The result, Amore, was released on the independent label Antenna and sold over 100,000 copies. Amore included songs like "All You Zombies", "Hanging on a Heartbeat", "Fightin' On The Same Side" and "Blood From A Stone", all of which would reappear in different versions on later albums.  Although a studio album, Amore captured the same energy and spirit that made The Hooters admired for their live performances.

That same year, Bazilian and Hyman were asked to write, arrange and perform on the debut album of a relatively unknown singer named Cyndi Lauper, She's So Unusual, which was being produced by their former producer and friend, Rick Chertoff.  Hyman co-wrote the song "Time After Time" (and also sang the lower harmony vocal in the choruses), which went to hit Number 1 on the Billboard Hot 100 Singles Chart and was subsequently nominated for a Grammy Award for Song of the Year. On July 26, 1984, at the Four Seasons Hotel in Philadelphia, Columbia Records signed the Hooters to their first major recording contract.

In 1984, local Philadelphia radio station WMMR sponsored a school spirit contest where local high school students were asked to send in the postcard to the station. The school with the most postcards would win a free concert by the band. The radio station received over 26 million postcards. After allegations of fraud that resulted in rioting as well as a series of lawsuits, no winner was declared and the concert never took place. 

Just before the band were about to experience mainstream success, bassist Rob Miller was seriously injured in an automobile accident and was replaced by Andy King.

Mainstream success (1985–1989)
The Hooters' 1985 Columbia Records debut album, Nervous Night, achieved platinum status around the world, selling in excess of two million copies and included Billboard Top 40 hits "Day By Day" (No. 18), "And We Danced" (No. 21) and "Where Do The Children Go" that featured accompanying vocals from Patty Smyth (No. 38). Rolling Stone named The Hooters "The Best New Band of the Year."

On July 13, 1985, The Hooters were the opening band at the Philadelphia Live Aid benefit concert, gaining international recognition for the first time. Bob Geldof said that he did not see the Hooters as a high-profile band suitable for Live Aid but that the band was forced on him by Bill Graham, promoter of Live Aid in the U.S. Geldof let his feelings be known during an interview for Rolling Stone saying: "Who the fuck are The Hooters?" The Hooters do not appear on the officially released DVD of the concert. Their first major overseas tour came later that year when they played throughout Australia.

On May 18, 1986, The Hooters participated in "America Rocks", the concert portion of the 1986 Kodak Liberty Ride Festival that celebrated the restoration of the Statue of Liberty and Ellis Island, at the Louisiana Superdome in New Orleans, Louisiana.  The three-hour concert was broadcast via satellite to 100 cities and also featured The Neville Brothers, Huey Lewis and the News, and Hall & Oates. On June 15, 1986, The Hooters participated in A Conspiracy of Hope, a benefit concert on behalf of Amnesty International, at Giants Stadium in East Rutherford, New Jersey. On September 5, 1986, The Hooters appeared on the 1986 MTV Video Music Awards, where they were nominated in the category of Best New Artist in a Video for "And We Danced."  They performed two songs on the show, "And We Danced" and "Nervous Night."

At Billboards 8th Annual Video Music Conference on November 22, 1986, The Hooters won two awards: Best Concert Performance for the "Where Do the Children Go" video and Best Longform Program for the full length Nervous Night home video.  They also placed in five categories in Billboard's Top 100 of 1986: Top Pop Artist, No. 41; Top Pop Album, No. 23; Top Pop Album Artists/Groups, No. 16; Top Pop Album Artists based on one album, No. 27; and Top Pop Singles Artists based on three singles, No. 3.

In 1987, The Hooters experienced their first major commercial success in Europe.  After heavy airplay in the United Kingdom, "Satellite," from the album One Way Home, became a hit single, reaching No. 22 in the UK Singles Chart.  The band performed on the popular British television show Top of the Pops on December 3, where they would meet one of their musical idols, Paul McCartney. The song itself proved controversial, however, for its satire of the excesses of 'televangelism'. "Satellite" was also featured in an episode of the television show Miami Vice titled "Amen...Send Money", which first aired on October 2, 1987, dealing with two warring televangelists. The accompanying video went even further depicting a young girl and her parents (who resemble the couple from Grant Wood's famous 'American Gothic' painting) attempting to watch 'The Three Stooges' interspersed with The Hooters performing, but being constantly interrupted by transmissions from a Christian show. Although never officially confirmed, the video contained barely concealed parodies of famous Christian televangelists Tammy Faye Bakker, Jerry Falwell, and Oral Roberts. On the tour supporting One Way Home, Fran Smith Jr. (bass, backing vocals) was brought in to replace Andy King, who left the band to pursue other interests.

On November 24, 1987, Thanksgiving night, The Hooters headlined the Spectrum in Philadelphia for the first time.  The show was broadcast live on MTV and the Westwood One radio network simultaneously, the second time the two networks had joined forces in producing a concert for one artist, the first being Asia in Asia on December 6, 1983.

In 1989, The Hooters issued their final release for Columbia Records. Zig Zag introduced a politically oriented theme, with Peter, Paul and Mary providing background vocals for an updated version of the 1960s folk song "500 Miles", which became an international hit.

International success (1990–1995)

In the 1990s, The Hooters' success in the United States began to wane, while their popularity overseas (especially in Europe) reached new heights. Following a show at The Town & Country Club in London in March 1988, the band had met Roger Waters of Pink Floyd, who told them that he was a fan.  This eventually led to their appearance in Waters' staging of The Wall Concert at Potsdamer Platz in Berlin on July 21, 1990.

Violinist/guitarist and multi-instrumentalist Mindy Jostyn (formerly with Joe Jackson, Billy Joel and others) joined the group for a short period during 1992–1993, adding a new voice to the mix.

In 1993, the band released their debut album for MCA Records, Out of Body.  While not a commercial success in the United States, the album found a large audience in Europe, especially in Sweden and Germany where "Boys Will Be Boys", a song that featured Cyndi Lauper, became a huge hit.

The Hooters Live, recorded over two nights in Germany in December 1993, was released in Europe and Asia in 1994, but never saw a release in the United States.

The band went on hiatus in 1995.

Reunited (2001–present)

On November 21, 2001, The Hooters performed a one-off show at the Spectrum in Philadelphia to celebrate disc jockey Pierre Robert's 20th anniversary at local rock radio station WMMR. WMMR was the first major station to play the music of The Hooters in the early 1980s.

In 2003, The Hooters reunited in Germany and completed a successful 17-city tour.  The success of the tour prompted two further tours in 2004 and 2005, where they premiered new unreleased songs and played in Switzerland and Sweden.

On May 11, 2004, The Hooters were presented with a Lifetime Achievement Award from the Philadelphia Music Awards.

November 2005 marked the appearance of The Hooters on VH1 Classic's concert series Decades Live Rock as guests of Cyndi Lauper where they performed "And We Danced" and "All You Zombies."

June 2006 saw The Hooters play their first official shows in the United States in over a decade. Over the course of three nights they performed three shows: a homecoming show at Philadelphia's Electric Factory on June 16; a show at The Borgata in Atlantic City, New Jersey on June 17; and finally, an outdoor show at Hubbard Park in Rob Hyman's hometown of Meriden, Connecticut on June 18.

Following these shows, The Hooters entered Hyman's Elmstreet Studios to record their first album of new material since 1993.  Time Stand Still was released in September 2007, preceded by a tour of Europe from June through August, with shows in Germany, Sweden, the Netherlands and Switzerland.

In November 2007, The Hooters returned to Europe for a short tour of Switzerland and Germany, including a show filmed for television in Basel, Switzerland as part the AVO Concerts Series. They then played two shows in their hometown of Philadelphia at the Electric Factory during Thanksgiving week on Wednesday, November 21 and Friday, November 23, with the latter show broadcast by radio station WXPN in 85 markets.

On February 28 and March 1, 2008, The Hooters once again entered Elmstreet Studios to begin work on a new album.  Accompanied by Ann Marie Calhoun on violin, the band recorded acoustic rearrangements of 12 of their previously released songs, which resulted in a double-disc set, along with the band's concerts the previous year at Philadelphia's Electric Factory.  The album, Both Sides Live, was released in November 2008.

In March 2008, The Hooters played two shows in support of Time Stand Still, which saw a Stateside release the previous month, including shows at B.B. King's Blues Club and Grill in New York City on March 6 and The Birchmere in Alexandria, Virginia on March 29.

In July 2008, The Hooters launched a European summer tour, playing shows in Norway, Sweden, Germany and Switzerland.

On October 23, 2009, in one of the last concerts at the Wachovia Spectrum, The Hooters, Todd Rundgren and Hall & Oates headlined a concert entitled "Last Call".

In 2017, The Hooters released an album called Give the Music Back: Live Double Album. The band toured in Europe and played stateside shows in the Philadelphia area.

Awards and nominations
{| class="wikitable sortable plainrowheaders" 
|-
! scope="col" | Award
! scope="col" | Year
! scope="col" | Nominee(s)
! scope="col" | Category
! scope="col" | Result
! scope="col" class="unsortable"| 
|-
! scope="row"|MTV Video Music Awards
| 1986
| "And We Danced"
|  Best New Artist in a Video
| 
| 
|-
!scope="row" rowspan=2|Pollstar Concert Industry Awards
| rowspan=2|1986
| rowspan=2|Tour
| Small Hall / Club Tour Of The Year
| 
| rowspan=2|
|-
| Next Major Arena Headliner
| 

Band members
Present
Eric Bazilian (1980–present): lead vocals, guitars, mandolin, harmonica, saxophone
Rob Hyman (1980–present): lead vocals, keyboards, accordion, melodica
David Uosikkinen (1980–present): drums, percussion
John Lilley (1983–present): guitar, mandolin, dobro, keyboards, backing vocals
Fran Smith Jr. (1987–present): bass guitar, backing vocals
Tommy Williams (2010–present): guitar, mandolin, mandola, backing vocals

Past
Bobby Woods (1980–1982): bass guitar (died 2010)
John Kuzma (1980–1982): guitar, backing vocals (died 2011)
Rob Miller (1983–1984): bass guitar, backing vocals
Andy King (1984–1987): bass guitar, backing vocals
Mindy Jostyn (1992–1993): violin, guitar, harmonica, backing vocals (died 2005)

Discography
Studio albums

Live albums

Selected compilationsNotesA^  It was a certification according to old criteria. Until September 24, 1999, Gold album was certified for sales of 250,000 and Platinum album for sales of 500,000 by International Federation of the Phonographic Industry, Germany (IFPI, Musik Industrie).
B^''' In Norway, this compilation was issued under the alternative title The Best of the Hooters''.

Singles

Video releases

See also

References

External links

Eric Bazilian official website
Rob Hyman official website
John Lilley official website
Fran Smith Jr. official website
David Uosikkinen official website

Rock music groups from Pennsylvania
Musical groups from Philadelphia
American new wave musical groups
Musical groups established in 1980
Roots rock music groups